The Curse of Tippecanoe (also known as Tecumseh's Curse, the 20-year Curse or the Zero Curse) is an urban legend about the deaths in office of presidents of the United States who were elected in years that end with the digit 0, which all are divisible by 20.

The presidents elected on such years from 1840 to 1960 died in office: William Henry Harrison (1840), Abraham Lincoln (1860), James A. Garfield (1880), William McKinley (1900), Warren G. Harding (1920), Franklin D. Roosevelt (1940) and John F. Kennedy (1960). These are seven of the eight presidents who have died in office. Since 1960, the three presidents who were elected on applicable years have not died in office. Ronald Reagan (1980) and George W. Bush (2000) survived their terms in office, though Reagan was shot in 1981. Joe Biden (2020) is the current president and the latest to be elected in a year fitting the pattern.

The phenomenon's name references Harrison's pre-presidential military expeditions, in which he defeated Native American tribes led by Tecumseh and Tenskwatawa at the Battle of Tippecanoe. Rumor has it that he was cursed by Tenskwatawa. The purported curse has been criticized as a coincidental pattern, and a 2009 survey of professional historians found no interest in or insight into the curse.

History
Thomas Jefferson (1800) and James Monroe (1820) preceded the supposed curse and outlived their presidencies by 17 and 6 years, respectively. Neither of them was ever targeted by an assassin. However, there is a curious coincidence that both men died on the Fourth of July.

William Henry Harrison was elected president in 1840 and died in 1841, just a month after being sworn in. In Tecumseh's War, Shawnee leader Tecumseh and his younger brother Tenskwatawa organized a confederation of Indian tribes to resist the westward expansion of the United States. In the 1811 Battle of Tippecanoe, Harrison defeated Tenskwatawa and his troops, acting as the governor of the Indiana Territory. Harrison thus earned the moniker "Old Tippecanoe".

In 1931 and 1948, the trivia book series Ripley's Believe It or Not! noted the pattern and termed it the "Curse of Tippecanoe". Strange as It Seems by John Hix ran a cartoon prior to the election of 1940 titled "Curse over the White House!" and claimed that "In the last 100 years, Every U.S. President Elected at 20-Year Intervals Has Died In Office!" In February 1960, journalist Ed Koterba noted that "The next President of the United States will face an eerie curse that for more than a century has hung over every chief executive elected in a year ending with zero."  Both of their hints at the elected president's death came true, with Roosevelt's death in 1945 and Kennedy's assassination in 1963.

The first written account to refer to the source of the curse was an article by Lloyd Shearer in 1980 in Parade magazine. It is claimed that when Tecumseh was killed in a later battle, Tenskwatawa set a curse against Harrison.

Running for re-election in 1980, President Jimmy Carter was asked about the curse at a campaign stop in Dayton, Ohio, on October 2 of that year while taking questions from the crowd. A high school student asked Carter if he was concerned about "predictions that every 20 years or election years ending in zero, the President dies in office." Carter replied, "I've seen those predictions. [...] I'm not afraid. If I knew it was going to happen, I would go ahead and be President and do the best I could till the last day I could."

Since the assassination of John F. Kennedy in 1963, no president has died in office. Ronald Reagan was shot and wounded severely two months after his 1981 inauguration. Days after Reagan survived the shooting, columnist Jack Anderson wrote "Reagan and the Eerie Zero Factor" in The Daily Intelligencer and asserted that the 40th president either had disproved the superstition or had nine lives. As the oldest man to be elected president at that time, Reagan also survived surgery in 1985. First Lady Nancy Reagan was reported to have hired psychics and astrologers to try to protect her husband from the effects of the curse. As his son Ron revealed, he began showing symptoms of Alzheimer's disease as early as three years into his first term. Reagan left office in 1989 and ultimately died from natural causes in 2004. He was 93 years old and had survived his presidency by 15 years.

The president elected in 2000, George W. Bush, also survived two terms in office. In 2005, a live grenade was thrown at him but failed to explode. Bush left office in 2009 and  has survived his presidency by 14 years and counting.

The only one of the eight presidents who died in office who was not elected on a year covered by the curse was Zachary Taylor, elected in 1848. Like Reagan and Bush, many presidents outside the curse have faced assassination attempts or medical problems.

Applicable presidents

Criticism
The failure of the curse after 1960 has been called by multiple sources a disproof of a supernatural explanation for the curse. An analyst cited in a 2000 article by fact-checker Snopes developed a more complex astrological explanation to account for Reagan's survival.

According to Timothy Redmond of the Skeptical Inquirer, the supposed curse demonstrates a number of logical fallacies, including confusing correlation with causation, cherrypicking, and moving the goalposts. In layman's terms, out of many unlikely eerie patterns, at least one of those hypothetical patterns is likely to come true. Snopes rates the curse on its fact-checking scale as a "legend", a rating given to over-general or unprovable claims, and denies a supernatural explanation for the curse.

In 2009, Steve Friess of Slate sought to interview notable presidential historians and security experts such as Michael Beschloss, Doris Kearns Goodwin, and Richard A. Clarke on the alleged curse, but none of them returned his calls. Michael S. Sherry, American history professor at Northwestern University, replied, "I doubt I have anything profound to say about this particular factoid, odd though it is."

See also 

 Acting President of the United States
 List of presidents of the United States who died in office
 Similar curses and regularities:
 Bald–hairy, a regularity observed in the sequence of Russian rulers since 1825.
 Kennedy curse
 Lincoln–Kennedy coincidences urban legend
 Redskins Rule
 Second-term curse

References

External links
The Mortal Presidency: Film and Documentary Shapell Manuscript Foundation
 Breaking Tecumseh's Curse
 The Curse of Tippecanoe on C-SPAN
 Tecumseh's Curse on indianapublicmedia.org

Curses
Presidential elections in the United States
United States presidential history
Presidency of William Henry Harrison
William Henry Harrison
Warren G. Harding
Franklin D. Roosevelt
Assassination of Abraham Lincoln
Assassination of James A. Garfield
Assassination of William McKinley
Assassination of John F. Kennedy
Tecumseh
United States presidents and death
Urban legends